Ning River is a tributary of Mei River. It originates and runs through Xingning, China.

See also
 List of rivers of China

Rivers of Guangdong
Tributaries of the Pearl River (China)